The Corncockle Sandstone Formation is a formation of Cisuralian age (Early Permian). It is part of the fill of the Lochmaben Basin in the Southern Uplands. It forms part of the Stewartry Group.

References

Permian Scotland